The Department of Agriculture of West Bengal is the specific arm of the Bengal government working to improve agriculture, develop export opportunities for agri produce and look after the welfare of farmers.

Works
It takes policy decisions on agricultural production and productivity, and by extension, on technology generation, ensuring availability and timely distribution of agriculture inputs specially seeds, fertilisers, subsidy, credit etc. Support service is provided through soil testing, soil and water conservation, seed testing and certification, plan production, quality control of fertilisers and pesticides, etc. Main stake holders for the Department are--(i) Farmers (ii) Government (iii) Manufacturer, dealers and retailers of Fertiliser, Seed and Pesticide (iv) Citizens in General.

See also 
 Regional Research Station

References 

Government departments of West Bengal
Agriculture in West Bengal
West Bengal